The  is an electric multiple unit (EMU) train type operated by the private railway operator Seibu Railway on commuter services in the Tokyo area of Japan. First introduced in 2000, a total of eight 10-car sets and eight 8-car sets were built between 1999 and 2005 by Hitachi for use on Seibu Ikebukuro Line and Seibu Shinjuku Line services.

Fleet
, the fleet consists of eight ten-car sets and eight eight-car (20050 series) sets, based at Kotesashi, Minami-Iriso, Musashigaoka, and Tamagawa-Josui depots for use on Seibu Shinjuku Line and Seibu Ikebukuro Line services.

Formations

8-car sets
The eight-car sets (20151 to 20158) are formed as shown below with four motored (M) cars and four unpowered trailer (T) cars, and car 8 at the Shinjuku/Ikebukuro end.

The M1 and M5 cars are each equipped with one single-arm pantograph.

10-car sets
The eight ten-car sets (20101 to 20108) are formed as shown below with five motored (M) cars and five unpowered trailer (T) cars, and car 10 at the Shinjuku/Ikebukuro end.

The M1, M3, and M5 cars are each equipped with one single-arm pantograph.

Interior
Wheelchair spaces are provided in the two outermost cars at each end. Priority seats are provided at the end of each car. Scrolling LED passenger information displays are provided above the doorways.

History
The first train was built in 1999, undergoing test running before entering revenue service in 2000.

In August 2015, set 20101 was modified with full-colour LED destination indicators replacing the original three-colour LED type.

Livery variations

Galaxy Express 999
From 8 October 2016, eight-car set 20158 operated in a special Galaxy Express 999 vinyl wrapping livery. It is scheduled to operate in this livery until March 2019.

L-train
From 15 January 2018, two ten-car sets, 20104 and 20105, are scheduled to operate in a special "L-train" livery consisting of the Saitama Seibu Lions baseball team colour of dark blue with Seibu Lions logos. From January 2022, the two sets' liveries were updated to depict 20 active players instead of the previous combination of veteran and current players. The sets re-entered service on the Shinjuku, Haijima, Ikebukuro, and Sayama lines from then.

References

External links

 Seibu 20000 series train information 

Electric multiple units of Japan
20000 series
Train-related introductions in 2000
Hitachi multiple units
1500 V DC multiple units of Japan